Joanne "Joey" Rebecca Burgess (born 23 September 1979) is an Australian international soccer player, who plays for Western Sydney Wanderers in the Australian W-League.

Career 
Burgess was raised in Campbelltown and began her career in the National Soccer League during the 1999–2000 season where she played for the NSW Sapphires.

W-league 
Burgess joined Sydney FC in the inaugural W-League season. Following that one-year stint, Burgess joined Brisbane Roar FC for 5 years, where she played on the wing.

During her time at Brisbane she played in 4 grand finals in 2009, 2011, 2012 and 2014, winning in 2011. After the 2014 W-League Grand Final, Burgess retired from professional soccer.

Return from retirement 
In 2016, Burgess came out of retirement to play for Western Sydney Wanderers as a more experienced player who could help a team that was consistently at the bottom of the table. Burgess was particularly excited to play for the Wanderers as she grew up in Western Sydney. She retired a second time after one season with the Wanderers.

National team 
Burgess represented Australia 40 times over her career. Her career highlights include playing in the 2006 AFC Women's Asian Cup and the 2007 FIFA Women's World Cup.

Burgess is also an Australian Futsal player, representing Australia in the 2008 Women's Futsal World Cup.

International goals

Honours

Club 
 Brisbane Roar
 W-League Championship: 2010–11

References

External links
 
 

1979 births
Living people
Australian women's soccer players
Sydney FC (A-League Women) players
Brisbane Roar FC (A-League Women) players
Western Sydney Wanderers FC (A-League Women) players
A-League Women players
Australia women's international soccer players
Women's association football midfielders
2007 FIFA Women's World Cup players